Philip van Noorden Schaap (April 8, 1951September 7, 2021) was an American radio host, who specialized in jazz as a broadcaster, historian, archivist, and producer. He began presenting jazz shows on Columbia University's WKCR in 1970, and hosted Bird Flight and Traditions In Swing on WKCR for 40 years, beginning in 1981. Schaap received six Grammy Awards over the course of his career.

Early years
Schaap was born in Queens on April 8, 1951.  He was raised in the Hollis neighborhood, and grew up as a fan of the Brooklyn Dodgers. An only child, he was raised by jazz-loving parents. His father was Walter Schaap, an early jazz historian and discographer. His mother, Marjorie Wood Schaap, worked as a librarian and was a classically trained pianist. At Radcliffe, she listened to Louis Armstrong records and smoked a corncob pipe. Schaap junior was friendly with many jazz musicians from a young age, particularly the members of the original Count Basie Orchestra, knocking on the front door of Buck Clayton, as well as visiting the home of Milt Hinton unannounced. Backstage with his mother at Randall’s Island Jazz Festival in August 1956, he first met Basie's drummer, Jo Jones, who asked if he knew of Prince Robinson (a tenor player for McKinney's Cotton Pickers several decades earlier). As a result of Schaap passing this test, Jones offered to become his babysitter. His father dropped him off at Jones's Manhattan apartment; they played Basie records and watched cartoons together.

By the 1950s, many leading African American musicians had moved into residential areas like Hollis in Queens, helpful for an emerging jazz enthusiast. In the first grade, Schaap tried to persuade Carole Eldridge, the daughter of trumpeter Roy Eldridge, to introduce him to her father, but only succeeded via her mother. Walter, Schaap's own father, at first disbelieved reports his young son (then 6 years old) was approaching major jazz musicians, explaining in 2001 that he rarely had sufficient courage himself. In his early teens, Schaap managed to gain a lift into Manhattan from Basie himself during the 1966 subway strike and amazed him with his recall of his orchestra's members and their repertory. "There isn’t anyone in the country who knows more about this music than he [does]," Max Roach told The New York Times in 2001. “He knows more about us than we know about ourselves."

Education and early career
Schaap attended Columbia University as a history major. While in college, Schaap worked as a sound engineer for the Grateful Dead on a number of occasions, including during the Columbia University protests of 1968. On February 2, 1970, his freshman year, he began broadcasting jazz on the Columbia University radio station, WKCR-FM.

Schaap graduated from Columbia in 1973. From around the time he began as a student radio disc jockey, he was running the Jazz program at The West End at 113th street across Broadway from WKCR at 114th St in New York City gaining work for swing era musicians he had known for years who were by then under-employed. The West End had a side bar called the Jazz Room where musicians hung out. He booked on a nightly basis such prominent swing-band alumni as The Countsmen (a Basie alumni band, which he managed, featuring alto saxophonist Earle Warren and trombonist Dicky Wells), Russell Procope's Ellingtonia, Franc Williams, George Kelly, Eddie Barefield, Sonny Greer, Benny Waters, Jo Jones, Buddy Tate, Vic Dickenson, Harold Ashby, Big Nick Nicholas, Ronnie Cole, Eddie Durham and "Doc" Cheatham.  He also booked modern jazz artists, such as Lee Konitz and Joe Albany, and blues artists, such as Percy France and Big Joe Turner.  Schaap engineered sound for jazz events, including George Wein's Newport Jazz Festival.

Broadcaster and archivist
From 1981, Schaap hosted two shows on WKCR: the morning show Bird Flight, broadcast weekdays from 8:20 to 9:30 AM, was devoted to the music of Charlie Parker.  Traditions In Swing was on Saturday evenings from 6 to 9 PM. On Bird Flight, Schaap presented authoritative disquisitions (in his "pontifical baritone") regarding Charlie Parker minutiae. By 2001, the radio station's archive contained about 5,000 hours of Schaap's oral history and he was reported to have raised about $2 million over many years to help the station continue its broadcasts. He continued as a radio broadcaster for a half-century, until 2020, when the COVID pandemic intervened.

Schaap was commissioned by Michael Cuscuna of Mosaic Records around 1988 to rescue unissued decaying recording of Charlie Parker made by Dean Benedetti forty years earlier. Schaap's work saw the recovery of 461 recorded fragments (Benedetti recorded only Parker, some fragments last only 20 seconds) from 18 nights of Parker's 1947 and 1948 nightclub appearances in Los Angeles and New York. The Complete Dean Benedetti Recordings of Charlie Parker (a 10 LP or 7 CD box set) was issued by Mosaic in 1990.

From 1984 to 1991, Schaap was the archivist for the Savoy Jazz label. He was involved with the re-issue of other recordings on CD by artists including Miles Davis, Billie Holiday, Benny Goodman, Louis Armstrong, and Duke Ellington. For his efforts in engineering, production, and liner notes, Schaap was nominated for eleven Grammy awards and had won seven, including three for producing, three for historical writing, and one for audio engineering.

Educator and writer
Schaap taught jazz at the graduate level at Columbia University and Rutgers University continued his academic teaching career at Princeton University and The Juilliard School, and ran an adult jazz education program for Jazz at Lincoln Center.  Upon becoming Curator at Jazz at Lincoln Center, he left a successful career producing, remastering, and writing for record companies such as Polygram (later absorbed by Universal) and Sony.

In addition to his liner notes, Schaap contributed to the 2005 book by Wynton Marsalis, Jazz ABZ: An A to Z Collection of Jazz Portraits.

In 2009, Schaap published the expanded reprint of Terry Waldo's "This is Ragtime," with a new foreword by Wynton Marsalis, under the imprint of Jazz at Lincoln Center Library Editions.

Honors and other references
Schaap was a distinguished member of the Board of Directors Advisory committee of The Jazz Foundation of America.

In October 2020, the National Endowment for the Arts (NEA) announced Schaap as one of four recipients of the NEA Jazz Masters Fellowships, celebrated in an online concert and show on April 22, 2021. Awarded in recognition of lifetime achievement, the honor is bestowed on individuals who have made significant contributions to the art form. The other 2021 recipients were Terri Lyne Carrington, Albert "Tootie" Heath, and Henry Threadgill.

Schaap played a radio announcer in the 2009 Kurt Vonnegut/Dave Soldier "radio opera" A Soldier's Story.

He was the inspiration for Woody Allen's on-screen character in Allen's film Sweet and Lowdown (1999). The feature film Miles Ahead (2015) contains a scene in which Miles Davis, played by Don Cheadle, calls up WKCR Radio and talks to Phil Schaap on air about Schaap's selection and commentary on Davis's music.

Personal life
Schaap resided in New York City.  He married Ellen LaFurn, a schoolteacher, in 1997.  She later returned to her former passion of singing jazz professionally. Their marriage was short-lived. Schaap was survived by his partner, Susan Shaffer; the couple had been together for 17 years.  He was a cousin of the sports journalist Dick Schaap.

Schaap died on September 7, 2021, at a hospital in Manhattan.  He was 70, and suffered from lymphoma prior to his death.

Awards and honors

Grammy Awards
 Best Album Notes 1989 (album notes writer) for Bird: The Complete Charlie Parker on Verve
 Best Album Notes 1993 (album notes writer) for The Complete Billie Holiday on Verve 1945–1959
 Best Historical Recording 1993 (producer) for The Complete Billie Holiday on Verve 1945–1959
 Best Audio Engineering 1996 (engineer) for Miles Davis & Gil Evans: The Complete Columbia Studio Recordings
 Best Album Notes 1996 (album notes writer) for Miles Davis & Gil Evans: The Complete Columbia Studio Recordings
 Best Historical Recording 1996 (producer & engineer) for Miles Davis & Gil Evans: The Complete Columbia Studio Recordings
 Best Historical Recording 2000 (producer & engineer) for Louis Armstrong: The Complete Hot Five and Hot Seven Recordings

References

Further reading

External links
WKCR
Interview with Phil Schaap, on the history of jazz programming on WKCR
Count Basie Centennial page on Phil Schaap
Phil Schaap Jazz The new home of Schaap Shop jazz memorabilia and Schaap radio archives
"In A Life of Jazz - a Jarring Note", The New York Times
"Jazz Historian to Record His Memory’s Fading Notes", The New York Times
Radio interview with Phil Schaap, on Vermont community radio.
 
 

1951 births
2021 deaths
Columbia College (New York) alumni
Grammy Award winners
Jazz record producers
Radio personalities from New York City
Record producers from New York (state)
Jazz radio presenters
Deaths from lymphoma
Deaths from cancer in New York (state)